Ophiopogon planiscapus is a species of flowering plant in the family Asparagaceae. It grows from short rhizomes, and bears tufts of grasslike leaves, from which purple or white flowers emerge in racemes held on short stems above the leaves. It is native to Japan, where it grows on open and forested slopes.

Garden use
The cultivar 'Kokuryu' (black mondo) is grown as groundcover, or as underplanting for larger shrubs. The pale lilac flowers are followed by black berries. It is also known as 'Black Dragon', 'Nigra' or 'Nigrescens'. It has received the Royal Horticultural Society's Award of Garden Merit.

There are also two variegated forms called 'Little Tabby' and 'Silver Ribbon'. These are green with white borders around the leaves.

Propagation
The plants spread by underground stolons with thick fleshy roots making fair sized colonies which can be separated by division in the spring.

References

External links

 Gardening help
 BBC Gardening

p
Flora of Japan
Garden plants of Asia
Groundcovers